Varun Badola (born 7 January 1974) is an Indian actor, known largely for his roles in television.

Early life
Varun Badola was born on 7 January 1974. His father is a known artist, Vishwa Mohan Badola. He has two elder sisters – Alka, who is married and has appeared in the TV serial Kumkum and Qubool Hai, and Kalindi, who is a radio jockey. His family hails from Garhwal, Uttarakhand.

Badola spent the early part of his childhood in Allahabad after which he lived in New Delhi. He did his schooling from Sardar Patel Vidyalaya in New Delhi. After completing college, he started working to fulfill his ambition to become an actor.

Acting career
Badola started his creative career as a costume coordinator followed by eight years experience of writing and directing. He assisted Tigmanshu Dhulia in Haasil and Charas, apart from acting in the two films. He had decided to take a break from directing to do some acting when he was offered the television serial Astitva.. Ek Prem Kahani.

Some of his successful soaps are include Banegi Apni Baat, Koshish - Ek Asha, Aroona Irani's  Des Mein Nikla Hoga Chand, and Astitva... Ek Prem Kahani. He shot to fame when he played the role of a mentally disabled person on the television show Koshish produced by Balaji Telefilms, which proved to be a super-hit on Zee TV. Badola has directed and written the script for the show Aek Chabhi Hai Padoss Mein.

He is an accomplished singer and dancer as well, having shown his talents on reality television shows including the celebrity dance show named Nach Baliye 2 with his wife Rajeshwari where he was one of the semi-finalists.  He is known to be an extremely hard-working actor and has been called television's Aamir Khan for his dedication and Dev Anand for his intense on-screen romance.

Badola and his wife Rajeshwari worked together on a play for the first time in a production called Shabd Leela which was based on Dr. Dharamveer Bharati's powerful love letters to his wife. He participated in the Celebrity Cricket League as a member of the team Mumbai Heroes, as an all-rounder.

Personal life
Varun married dancer/singer/actress Rajeshwari Sachdev on 24 November 2004. They met on the sets of the television show Antakshari and were engaged the same year. They have a son, born on 10 May 2010 at the Benzer Hospital, Lokhandwala. Badola has a farm house in his native Uttarakhand at a place called Bhabher in Kotdwar.

Television

Fiction shows

Reality shows

Filmography

References

External links 

 
 

1974 births
Living people
Male actors from Delhi
People from New Delhi
Indian male soap opera actors
Participants in Indian reality television series
Male actors in Hindi television
Male actors in Hindi cinema
21st-century Indian male actors